Ruben Wálter Paz Márquez (born 8 August 1959) is a Uruguayan former professional footballer who played as a midfielder. Paz played at two FIFA World Cups for Uruguay and was also South American Footballer of the Year in 1988. He retired in 2006 at the age of 47. He's currently Peñarol's assistant coach.

Club career
Ruben Paz began his career at the age of 17 when he joined the Club Atlético Peñarol Montevideo in 1977. He played in Peñarol until February 1982, where he obtained important achievements, winning 3 Uruguayan league championships (1978, 1979 and 1981) and became top scorer of the Uruguayan league by 1981.

In 1982, he emigrated to the Brazilian League, specifically the Rio Grande do Sul team Internacional, where he won three consecutive Gaúcho championships (1982, 1983, 1984) and was considered the best player of the Brazilian league by 1985/86.

In 1986 he makes the leap to Europe, specifically to Matra Racing Paris (now the Racing Club de France) of the Ligue 1 of French Football, where he played alongside his compatriot Enzo Francescoli.

That same year he was crowned as both the Argentinian and South American Footballer of the Year. He was one of the few players in Argentinian football to be respected by all supporters.

During the 1989–90 season he transferred to Genoa in the Serie A of the Italian Football League, coinciding with two compatriots, José Perdomo and Carlos Aguilera.

The following year he returned to Racing Club. In 1993 he returned to Uruguay to play in Rampla Juniors, and the following year moved to the Frontera Rivera club, where he stayed until 2000, except for the 1996 season, when he played for Godoy Cruz of Mendoza, Argentina. Later he continued to play in smaller clubs, ending his playing career in 2006.

International career
Participated in the Uruguayan team that won the Mundialito in 1980. Later he played in two editions of the World Cup, those held in Mexico in 1986 and Italy in 1990, in which his national team was eliminated in second round by Italy.

Career statistics

International

Scores and results list Uruguay's goal tally first, score column indicates score after each Paz goal.

Honours
Peñarol
Primera División: 1978, 1979, 1981

Internacional
Campeonato Gaúcho: 1982, 1983, 1984

Racing Club
Supercopa Sudamericana: 1988
Supercopa Interamericana: 1988

Uruguay
 Mundialito: 1980
 South American U-20 Championship: 1977, 1979

References

External links

 Rúben Paz at Racing Club's official site 
 Rubén Paz at Internacional's official site 
 Profile 

1959 births
Living people
Uruguayan footballers
Association football midfielders
Peñarol players
Rampla Juniors players
Racing Club de France Football players
Sport Club Internacional players
Racing Club de Avellaneda footballers
Godoy Cruz Antonio Tomba footballers
Genoa C.F.C. players
Uruguayan Primera División players
Uruguayan beach soccer players
Ligue 1 players
Serie A players
Uruguay international footballers
Uruguay under-20 international footballers
1986 FIFA World Cup players
1990 FIFA World Cup players
1979 Copa América players
1989 Copa América players
South American Footballer of the Year winners
Uruguayan expatriate footballers
Uruguayan expatriate sportspeople in France
Expatriate footballers in France
Uruguayan expatriate sportspeople in Brazil
Expatriate footballers in Brazil
Uruguayan expatriate sportspeople in Argentina
Expatriate footballers in Argentina
Uruguayan expatriate sportspeople in Italy
Expatriate footballers in Italy